Happy Moods is an album by American jazz pianist Ahmad Jamal featuring performances recorded in 1960 and released on the Argo label.

Critical reception

Allmusic awarded the album 3 stars stating "Happy Moods does nothing to diminish the position of those who believe that the pianist deserves a considerably higher spot than he is usually accorded".

Track listing
 "Little Old Lady" (Hoagy Carmichael, Stanley Adams) – 5:10  
 "For All We Know" (J. Fred Coots, Sam M. Lewis) – 2:42 
 "Pavanne" (Morton Gould) – 5:42
 "Excerpt from the Blues" (Ahmad Jamal) – 2:58   
 "You'd Be So Easy to Love" (Cole Porter) – 3:16  
 "Time on My Hands" (Harold Adamson, Mack Gordon, Vincent Youmans) – 1:34  
 "Rain Check" (Billy Strayhorn) – 4:45 
 "I'll Never Stop Loving You" (Nicholas Brodszky, Sammy Cahn) – 3:01  
 "Speak Low" (Ogden Nash, Kurt Weill) – 4:53  
 "Rhumba No. 2" (Jamal) – 2:35

Personnel
Ahmad Jamal – piano
Israel Crosby – bass
Vernel Fournier – drums

References 

Argo Records albums
Ahmad Jamal albums
1960 albums